Fair Lawn is the name of several places in the United States of America:

Fair Lawn, Connecticut
Fair Lawn, New Jersey
Radburn-Fair Lawn Station, Fair Lawn, New Jersey, listed on the NRHP in New Jersey
Broadway-Fair Lawn Station, Fair Lawn, New Jersey
Fair Lawn (Cold Spring, New York), listed on the NRHP in New York

See also
Fairlawn (disambiguation)